Jimmy Taylor was a college basketball coach. From 1970 to 1975, he served as the head coach at South Alabama, where he compiled a 75-53 (.586) record.

References

External links
South Alabama Athletics

Year of birth missing (living people)
Living people
American men's basketball coaches
South Alabama Jaguars men's basketball coaches